Solve Education! (SE!) is a global technology non-profit organization founded in 2015 by Peng Tsin Ong and Janine Teo (Peihan). Solve Education! is making education and employment accessible to children and youth who do not have access to school around the globe.

Using a mobile game application, out-of-school youth can improves their literacy rate along with improving skills such as life skills, numeracy skills, and gain work experience which will better prepare them for the upcoming challenges.

The team of Solve Education! consist of subject experts who have developed an educational gaming app with which they deliver lessons to students from developing countries. It is headquartered in Singapore, and it has offices in Indonesia, the United States, India and Nigeria.

History 
Solve Education! was founded in December 2015 after Peng Tsin Ong attended the Africa Innovation Summit in Cape Verde in 2014 where he led a plenary session on financing innovation. At the end of the summit, he engaged stakeholders from Africa on the ideal educational intervention for narrowing the gap of education inequalities to help produce knowledge workers for a knowledge economy. It was after the summit that Solve Education! was born, to offer scalable educational intervention which can work with limited infrastructure in low income countries of Asia and around the world.

In 2017, Solve Education! launched its mobile learning app, Dawn of Civilization, in Indonesia.

Janine Teo, the incumbent chief executive officer, is a member of the high-level advisory group on digital technology at the Asian Development Bank.

Services

Dawn of Civilization 
Dawn of Civilization (DoC) is a city-building game which is based on various subjects and itself contains mini-games. The game was launched in 2017 and is made to be operated on low-end mobile devices. SE! leverages gamification and artificial intelligence to maximizing the ubiquity of mobile phones and broadband to make sure education reaches children and youth in low-income countries.

Ed the Learning Bot 
It is an AI-based chatbot used by Solve Education! on Telegram. It helps underserved young people to learn about any subject with the help of gamified pictures and text. The major subject taught by the bot is English, while other subjects are also available. Solve Education! has partnered with various other organizations to gamify their learning modules and spread the education using chatbot.
The bot has been launched in Nigeria and it has been reviewed by the Ministry of Education, Nigeria and has acknowledged its role to improve the literacy of youth.

Content+ 
It is an open platform which facilitates educational content providers to add their content in order to meet the needs of beneficiaries. The added contents are accessible on Dawn of Civilization and Ed the learning bot.

Learnalytics 
It is a tool developed by Solve Education! Which helps measure the performance.
Additionally, Learning Portal Analytics, provides context, the learning progress and performance of the students as they learn. Further, it can also be tracked in real-time using the platform.

Solve Employment! 
In order to reward learning and motivate out-of-school children and youth to study more, Solve Education! links progress on the game to employment opportunities.

Game for Charity 
It is a point-based program which was introduced during the COVID-19 pandemic. By completing learning modules, students can earn points which they can later exchange for food packages. Solve Education! is working with various organizations, notably Nusantra Innovation Forum, Putera Sampoerna Foundation, East Java Government of Indonesia to gamify the pandemic-safety education package for underserved children in Indonesia.

Youth Well-being Education 
Solve Education! in partnership with Badan Kependudukan dan Keluarga Berencana Nasional (BKKBN), a government body operating under the Ministry of Health Indonesia, launched their digital comic book which addresses family planning issues in Indonesia.

Recognition 
 Ashoka x Google.org ChangeMakers 2020 
 Next Billion EdTech Prize 2019 Finalist
 QS Reimagine Education, Best Educational App 2020 Finalist
 Cisco Global Problem Solver 2020 Semi-finalist
 2019 Innovate for Good Challenge Semi-finalists
 World Summit Awards 2018
 Singtel Future Makers 2017
 MIT SOLVE: Youth Skills and the Workforce of the future 2017

References

External links 
 Official website
 Ed the Learning Bot

Non-profit organizations based in Indonesia
Organizations established in 2015